The canoeing competitions at the 2013 Mediterranean Games in Mersin took place between 27 June and 29 June at the Çukurova University Boathouse Venues.

Athletes competed in 6 sprint kayak events.

Medal summary

Men's events

Women's events

Medal table

References

Sports at the 2013 Mediterranean Games
2013
2013 in canoeing
Canoeing in Turkey